On the Road Again may refer to:

Albums
 On the Road Again, a 1976 D. J. Rogers album
 On the Road Again, a 1978 Rockets album
 On the Road Again, a 1979 Roy Wood album
 On the Road Again, a 1989 compilation album by Canned Heat
 On the Road Again, a 2010 album by Katchafire
 Live—On the Road Again 1989, a 1990 album by Bernard Lavilliers

Songs

 "On the Road Again" (Bob Dylan song), 1965
 "On the Road Again" (The Lovin' Spoonful song), 1965
 "On the Road Again" (Canned Heat song), 1968
 "On the Road Again" (Willie Nelson song), 1980
 "On the Road Again", a song by Barrabás from their album Piel de Barrabás, 1981
 "On the Road Again", a song by Aerosmith from Pandora's Box, 1991

Television
 On the Road Again (TV series), a 1987–2007 Canadian documentary series
 "On the Road Again?" (Hannah Montana), an episode of Hannah Montana and the third segment of That's So Suite Life of Hannah Montana

Tours
 On the Road Again Tour, the 2015 concert tour by English-Irish boy band One Direction

See also
 Spain... on the Road Again, a 2008 American food and travel series
 On the Road (disambiguation)
 "Turn the Page" (Bob Seger song)